The 2017 AFF U-16 Girls' Championship was the 2nd edition of the AFF U-16 Girls' Championship, an international women's football tournament organised by the ASEAN Football Federation (AFF). The tournament was hosted by Laos in Vientiane from 8 to 20 May 2017. All matches were played at the New Laos National Stadium.The defending champion is Australia but they didn't participate in this edition.

Participants

Group A

Group B

Venue

Group stage

Group A

Group B

Knockout stage 
In the knockout stage, the penalty shoot-outs are used to decide the winner if necessary (extra time is not used).

Semi-finals

Third place play-off

Final 

Note: All matches had been played for 80 minutes, i.e., each 40 minutes for both first half & second half.

Winner

Awards
Thailand won the fair play trophy.

References 

AFF Women's Championship